The Australia national cricket team toured South Africa from October to November 1921 and played a three-match Test series against South Africa. Australia won the Test series 1–0. Australia were captained by Herbie Collins; South Africa by Herbie Taylor.

Australian team
 Herbie Collins (captain)
 Tommy Andrews
 Warren Bardsley
 Hanson Carter
 Jack Gregory
 Hunter Hendry
 Charlie Macartney
 Ted McDonald
 Arthur Mailey
 Edgar Mayne
 Bert Oldfield
 Nip Pellew
 Jack Ryder
 Johnny Taylor

The Australians were on their way home from their five-Test tour of England. Their team was unchanged, except that Warwick Armstrong, the captain on the tour of England, did not go on to South Africa.

Test series summary
Australia won the Test series 1–0 with two matches drawn.

Match length: 4 days (excluding Sundays). Balls per over: 6.

First Test

Second Test

Third Test

The tour

All 14 of the Australian team played at least one Test in the series; South Africa also used 14 players.

References

External links
 Australia in South Africa 1921-22 at CricketArchive

1921 in South African cricket
1921 in Australian cricket
Australia 1921-22
1921-22
International cricket competitions from 1918–19 to 1945